Bull Canyon may refer to:

 Bull Canyon (California), Riverside County, California

 Bull Canyon Formation, a geological formation in New Mexico
 Bull Canyon Provincial Park, British Columbia, Canada